Charles-Eugène Pouliot (December 19, 1856 – June 24, 1897) was a lawyer and political figure in Quebec. He represented Témiscouata in the Legislative Assembly of Quebec from 1890 to 1892 and Témiscouata in the House of Commons of Canada from 1896 to 1897 as a Liberal.

He was born in Rivière-du-Loup, Canada East, the son of Jean-Baptiste Pouliot and Sophronie Blais. Pouliot was educated at the Séminaire de Québec and went on to study law at the Université Laval. He was called to the Quebec bar in 1879 and set up practice in Rivière-du-Loup. Pouliot ran unsuccessfully for a federal seat in 1887. In the same year, he was married to Stella-Anita Bertrand. He was defeated by Napoléon Rioux when he ran for reelection to the Quebec assembly in 1892. He died in office in Fraserville at the age of 40.

His son Jean-François Pouliot served in the House of Commons and Canadian senate. His nephew Camille-Eugène Pouliot also served as a member of the Quebec assembly.

Archives 
There is a Charles-Eugène Pouliot fonds at Library and Archives Canada. Archival reference number is MG27-IIE7.

References 
 

Quebec Liberal Party MNAs
Liberal Party of Canada MPs
Members of the House of Commons of Canada from Quebec
1856 births
1897 deaths
People from Rivière-du-Loup